"Going Out Tonight" is a song co-written and recorded by American country music artist Mary Chapin Carpenter.  It was released in September 1991 as the fourth single from her album Shooting Straight in the Dark.  The song reached number 14 on the Billboard Hot Country Singles & Tracks chart in January 1992.  It was written by Carpenter and John Jennings.

Chart performance

References

1991 singles
Mary Chapin Carpenter songs
Columbia Records singles
Songs written by Mary Chapin Carpenter
Songs written by John Jennings (musician)
1990 songs